The Uganda women's national rugby union team, known as the Lady Rugby Cranes, are a national sporting side of Uganda that represents them at rugby union. The side played their first test against Rwanda in 2005.

History 
Uganda played their first international test on 26 February 2005 against Rwanda in Kigali. They trounced the hosts 92–0 in their biggest win. The two sides met again in Kampala ten days later where hosts, Uganda, trounced Rwanda a second time 81–0.

Uganda and Kenya have competed for the Elgon Cup since they first clashed in 2006. In 2016, Uganda were ranked 39th in World Rugby's ranking. They are currently ranked 35th.

Results summary
(Full internationals only)

Results

Full internationals

Other matches

External links
Uganda Rugby Football Union - Official Site

Notes

 
Women's national rugby union teams
Rugby union in Uganda

fr:Équipe d'Ouganda de rugby à XV